Narcissus is a 1983 Canadian short musical and experimental film directed by Norman McLaren and produced by David Verrall, visualizing the legend of Narcissus in a modern way. It was produced for the National Film Board of Canada.

Cast
 Jean-Louis Morin as "Narcissus"
 Sylvie Kinal as "Nymph"
 Sylvain Lafortune as "A friend"

Production
The film had a budget of $702,607.

Awards
 International Film Festival of India, New Delhi: Golden Peacock for Best Short Film of the Festival, 1984
 Dance on Camera Festival, New York: Gold Star Award, 1984
 Yorkton Film Festival, Yorkton: Golden Sheaf for Best Experimental Film, 1984
 American Film and Video Festival, New York: Honorable Mention, Visual Essays, 1984
 Columbus International Film & Animation Festival, Columbus, Ohio: Honorable Mention, 1984
 Cartagena International Film Festival, Murcia, Spain: Special Mention 1985
 International Romantic Film Festival, Divonne-les-Bains: First Prize/Madame de Stael Prize, 1985

References

Works cited

External links

1983 films
Films without speech
Films based on classical mythology
Films directed by Norman McLaren
Films shot in Montreal
Ballet films
Films scored by Maurice Blackburn
Films based on Metamorphoses
Canadian LGBT-related short films
1983 LGBT-related films
1980s Canadian films
Canadian avant-garde and experimental short films